Suriya Kupalang (born March 21, 1988) is a Thai professional footballer who plays as a defender for Thai League 2 club Samut Sakhon.

Club career

Honours

Club
Raj Pracha
 Regional League Division 2: 2009
 Regional League Bangkok Area Division: 2009

External links
 Profile at Goal

1988 births
Living people
Suriya Kupalang
Suriya Kupalang
Association football defenders
Suriya Kupalang
Suriya Kupalang
Suriya Kupalang
Suriya Kupalang
Suriya Kupalang
Suriya Kupalang